HP WinRunner software was an automated functional GUI testing tool that allowed a user to record and play back user interface (UI) interactions as test scripts.

As a functional test suite, it worked with HP QuickTest Professional and supported enterprise quality assurance. It captured, verified and replayed user interactions automatically, in order to identify defects and determine whether business processes worked as designed.

The software implemented a proprietary Test Script Language (TSL) that allowed customization and parameterization of user input.

HP WinRunner was originally written by Mercury Interactive. Mercury Interactive was subsequently acquired by Hewlett Packard (HP) in 2006.  On February 15, 2008, HP Software Division announced the end of support for HP WinRunner versions 7.5, 7.6, 8.0, 8.2, 9.2—suggesting migration to HP Functional Testing software as a replacement.

Helping Guides 
WinRunner User's Guide
WinRunner TSL Reference Guide

Open Source Frameworks for WinRunner
 SAFS (Software Automation Framework Support)
 EMOS-Framework (GUI Modeling)

See also

List of GUI testing tools
Test automation

External links
Official Homepage HP Functional Testing software

References

Graphical user interface testing
WinRunner